Connor Ryan Swindells (born 19 September 1996) is an English actor and model. Beginning his career in the mid-2010s, he came to prominence for portraying Adam Groff on the Netflix comedy-drama series Sex Education (2019–present).

Early life
Swindells was born in Lewes, East Sussex. His mother died from bowel cancer when he was seven years old. He has said that he is still processing this.

After her death, he and his father went to live with Connor's paternal grandparents in West Chiltington until moving out to Billingshurst, both in the Horsham District of West Sussex. Swindells attended Rydon Community College and Steyning Grammar School. Swindells dropped out of college at age 17.

Career 
He started acting when he saw an audition poster for a local play and his friend dared him to audition; he got the lead role. He then acted in two more local plays and got an agent at the end of the third play.

In 2017, he guest-starred in an episode of Harlots, portraying Mostyn. He also appeared in an episode of Sky One drama Jamestown, playing Fletcher.

In March 2017, Swindells was cast to replace Joe Alwyn as Donald in The Vanishing, a Scottish psychological thriller film directed by Kristoffer Nyholm, starring Gerard Butler and Peter Mullan. Principal photography started in April 2017, it was released on 4 January 2019.

He starred as Adam in the 2018 drama film VS. directed by Ed Lilly.

Since 2019, he has appeared alongside Ncuti Gatwa, Emma Mackey, Asa Butterfield, and Gillian Anderson in the Netflix comedy-drama series Sex Education as Adam Groff, the headmaster's son, initially a bully who has a tense relationship with his father.

Swindells is set to appear in Greta Gerwig’s Barbie, alongside Sex Education co-stars Ncuti Gatwa and Emma Mackey.

Filmography

Film

Television

Awards and nominations

References

External links 

 Connor Swindells on Hamilton Hodell's website

Living people
1996 births
21st-century English male actors
English male television actors
English male film actors
English male models
Male actors from Sussex
People educated at Steyning Grammar School
People from West Chiltington
People from Lewes